480p is the shorthand name for a family of video display resolutions. The p stands for progressive scan, i.e. non-interlaced. The 480 denotes a vertical resolution of 480 pixels, usually with a horizontal resolution of 640 pixels and 4:3 aspect ratio ( 640) or a horizontal resolution of 854 or less (848 should be used for mod16 compatibility) pixels for an approximate 16:9 aspect ratio ( 853.). Since a pixel count must be a whole number, in Wide VGA displays it is generally rounded up to 854 to ensure inclusion of the entire image. The frames are displayed progressively as opposed to interlaced. 480p was used for many early plasma televisions. However, standard definition defines a 15.7k Hz horizontal scanrate, which means that interlacing has to be used for those resolution modes. The lowercase letter "p" in 480p stands for progressive, so the two must not be confused.

ATSC progressive mode standards 

The ATSC digital television standards define 480p with 640×480p (4:3) pixel resolutions, at 24, 30, or 60 frames per second. When 480p30 is broadcast on air, it is frame doubled then interlaced to 480i60. The spatial resolution hasn't changed, but a 480p video stored in digital RGB format is transcoded and modulated when broadcast on the analog television network. 24 fps however, needs to be processed using the 3:2 pulldown technique to be broadcast to TVs, even if the spatial resolution in the stored media is the same as the output resolution.

Resolutions

See also

 Enhanced-definition television (EDTV)
 List of common resolutions
 4320p, 2160p, 1080p, 1080i, 720p, 576p, 576i, 480i, 360p, 240p
 Display Resolution

References

Television terminology
Video formats